The 2021 SLC Invitational T20 League or Dialog Invitational T20 League (for sponsors) was a Twenty20 cricket tournament that took place in Sri Lanka from 12 to 24 August 2021. All the matches were played at the Pallekele International Cricket Stadium, in Kandy, and were used as preparation for South Africa's tour of Sri Lanka and the 2021 ICC Men's T20 World Cup. Four teams took part, with the top two sides playing each other in the final.

Both of the matches scheduled to take place on the opening day of the tournament were rescheduled to the following day due to rain. Following a COVID-19 case in the team hotel, the matches scheduled for 20 August 2021 were moved back by one day. In the final group match, SLC Reds beat SLC Greens by six wickets to join SLC Greys in the final of the tournament. In the final, SLC Greys beat SLC Reds by 42 runs to win the tournament. Minod Bhanuka was named the player of the match in the final and Dasun Shanaka was named the player of the series.

Squads
The following teams and squads were named for the tournament. Prior to the first match, several changes to the squads were made. Himasha Liyanage and Kamil Mishara both moved to SLC Greys, and Prabath Jayasuriya moved to SLC Reds. Sandun Weerakkody, Jehan Daniel, Sangeeth Cooray, Koshan Dhanushka, Lahiru Gamage, Ashan Randika and Lasith Embuldeniya all failed a fitness test. Finally, Sachindu Colombage, Nimesh Vimukthi and Mohamed Shiraz all tested positive for COVID-19 and were ruled out of the tournament.

Fixtures

Round-robin

Final

References

External links
 Series home at ESPN Cricinfo

SLC Invitational T20 League